DAV Public School (now renamed DAV Sr. Sec. Public School), Jhingurdah is a public secondary school run by the DAV Managing Committee in Jhingurdah Project, Singrauli, Madhya Pradesh, India.

It is a co-educational day school with a strength of around 1100. DAV Jhingurdah is affiliated to the Central Board of Secondary Education (CBSE). It is a project school funded mainly by the Northern Coalfields Limited (NCL). The school was up to the 10th standard and recently senior secondary class in Commerce stream has been started. Currently, the Head of school is Shailesh Singhal. Most of the students are wards of NCL employees and a few local residents. The NCL has facilitated the bus facility for the nearby areas from Singrauli and Gorbi.

Campus 
The School is a co-educational day school with a strength of around 2000 students. The campus has a main old building for student of Kindergarten to XII standards. A new building contains laboratories and classes for the senior secondary students.  It has a play ground consisting of a football field/cricket ground. It also has a handball court (less popular in other parts of India), a Kho kho field, athletics tracks, volleyball court and a badminton court. The grounds stands have been recently developed.

See also
 D.A.V. Public Schools System

References 

Schools in Madhya Pradesh
Singrauli
Schools affiliated with the Arya Samaj
Schools in Singrauli district